Vasupujya is the twelfth tirthankara in Jainism of the avasarpini (present age). According to Jain beliefs, he became a siddha, a liberated soul which has destroyed all of its karma. Vasupujya was born to King Vasupujya and Queen Jaya Devi at Champapuri in the Ikshvaku dynasty. His birth date was the fourteenth day of the Falgun Krishna month of the Indian calendar. He never married and remained a celibate.  He attained Kevala Jnana within one month of Tapsya and Moksha at Champapuri, of Bihar in India on the fourteenth day of the bright half of the month of Ashadh.

Biography
Vasupujya Swami was the 12th tirthankara in Jainism of the Avasarpini (present age). According to Jain beliefs, he became a siddha, a liberated soul which has destroyed all of its karma. Vasupujya was born to King Vasupujya and Queen Jaya Devi at Champapuri in the Ikshvaku dynasty. His birth date was the fourteenth day of the Falgun Krishna month of the Indian calendar.  He attained Kevala Jnana within one month of Tapsya and Moksha at Champapuri, Bhagalpur in India on the fourteenth day of the bright half of the month of Ashadh.

The second Vasudeva, Dwiprishtaha, was his devotee. He and his brother Baldeva Shrivijay conquered Prativasudeva Tark and brought his oppressive rule to an end. Shrivijay later joined the ascetic order of Lord Vasupujya.

Temples
 Jain temple, Alleppey, Kerala
 Champapuri
 Shri Atma Vallabh Jain Smarak
 SHRI VASUPUJYA SWAMY RATH MANDIR MALKAJGIRI TELENGANA

Statue
The tallest statue of Vasupujya, 31 feet in height, was inaugurated at Nathnagar Temple, Champapuri, Bhagalpur, Bihar in 2014. The statue was constructed and donated by Smt Sona Devi Sethi Charitable Trust, based at Phulchand Sethi complex Dimapur.

See also

God in Jainism
Arihant (Jainism)
Jainism and non-creationism

References

Sources
 

 

Tirthankaras